Pinguicula esseriana is a small carnivorous plant in the genus Pinguicula, the butterworts. It is native to Mexico but is frost-tolerant despite its tropical habitat.

References 

esseriana
Flora of Mexico